In the Eastern Orthodox tradition, a hieromartyr is a martyr (one who dies for his beliefs) who was a bishop or priest. Analogously, a monk who is a priest is known as a hieromonk.

See also
New Martyr

References 
 Webster: Hieromartyr

Eastern Orthodox clergy
Eastern Orthodox martyrs
Types of saints